Sodium stannate, formally sodium hexahydroxostannate(IV), is the inorganic compound with the formula Na2[Sn(OH)6].  This colourless salt forms upon dissolving metallic tin or tin(IV) oxide in sodium hydroxide, and is used as a stabiliser for hydrogen peroxide.  In older literature, stannates are sometimes represented as having the simple oxyanion SnO32−, in which case this compound is sometimes named as sodium stannate–3–water and represented as Na2SnO3·3H2O, a hydrate with three waters of crystallisation.  The anhydrous form of sodium stannate, Na2SnO3, is recognised as a distinct compound with its own CAS Registry Number,  and a distinct material safety data sheet.

Alkali metal stannate compounds are prepared by dissolving elemental tin in a suitable metal hydroxide, in the case of sodium stannate by the reaction:
Sn   +   2 NaOH   +   4 H2O   →   Na2[Sn(OH)6]   +   2 H2
A similar reaction occurs when tin dioxide is dissolved in base:
SnO2   +   2 NaOH   +   2 H2O   →   Na2[Sn(OH)6]
The anhydrous form can also be prepared from tin dioxide by roasting with sodium carbonate in a mixed carbon monoxide / carbon dioxide environment:
SnO2   +   Na2CO3   →   Na2SnO3   +   CO2

The anion is a coordination complex that is octahedral in shape, similar to most stannates, such as the hexachlorostannate anion . The Sn—O bond distances average 2.071 Å.

References

Stannates
Sodium compounds
Hydroxides